The 1955 Western Illinois Leathernecks football team represented Western Illinois University as a member of the Interstate Intercollegiate Athletic Conference (IIAC) during the 1955 college football season. Led by second-year head coach Wes Stevens, the Leathernecks finished the season with an overall record of 6–3–1 and a mark of 3–2–1 in conference play, placing fourth in the IIAC. Western Illinois later forfeited its win over Illinois State Normal, dropping its season record to 5–4–1 overall and 2–3–1 in the IIAC, putting the team into a fourth-place tie with Illinois State. The forfeit came as a result of Western Illinois using an ineligible player, quarterback Sam Esposito; while Esposito also played in other games for the team, Illinois State Normal was the only school to protest their result.

Western Illinois back Don Lashmet was selected by the Associated Press as a first-team player on the 1955 All-Interstate Conference football team. Lashmet led the conference in pass receiving with 16 catches for 299 yards and two touchdowns. As a team, Western Illinois led the conference with 40 pass completions for 611 yards. Bill Vandermerkt was credited with 30 of the team's completed passes.

Schedule

References

Western Illinois
Western Illinois Leathernecks football seasons
Western Illinois Leathernecks football